Playas del Coco is one of the oldest beach communities in Guanacaste Province, Costa Rica. This region is also one of the fastest-growing tourism areas in Costa Rica. A popular destination for both local Costa Ricans and visitors from other countries during the traditional holiday seasons, local Costa Ricans refer to Playas del Coco affectionately as "El Coco". At the same time, travelers from outside of Costa Rica use the name "Coco Beach", when mentioning this locale.

Playas del Coco is located approximately 20 miles (32 kilometers) from the town of Liberia, Costa Rica, the largest town in the province of Guanacaste. The town experienced rapid growth due to the increasing number of international visitors and foreign-born residents, who arrived in the 1990s. Since Playas del Coco is one of the few beach areas in Guanacaste with a rapidly expanding infrastructure, it has become a hub for tourism and business. Other adjacent beach areas continue to grow as tourism-related activities, and the local population base expand.

References

{2013/Publicaciones de Estadísticas Vitales.pdf}

Populated places in Guanacaste Province
Tourist attractions in Guanacaste Province
Beaches of Costa Rica